This is a list of military clothing camouflage patterns used for battledress. Military camouflage is the use of camouflage by a military force to protect personnel and equipment from observation by enemy forces. Textile patterns for uniforms have multiple functions, including camouflage, identifying friend from foe, and esprit de corps.

The list is organized by pattern; only patterned textiles are shown. It includes current and past issue patterns, with dates; users may include armies or militias, navies, air forces, space forces, marines, special forces, airborne forces, border/coast guards, military police forces, and other security forces or gendarmeries.



Patterns

See also
 Military uniform
 Snow camouflage#Military usage

References

External links

 Camopedia
 Camotest
 Camouflage Pattern Generator

 
Patterns
Military lists
military

ja:迷彩